The members of the Parliament of Fiji from September 1977 to 1982 consisted of members of the House of Representatives elected between 17 and 24 September 1977, and members of the nominated Senate.

House of Representatives

Senate

References

 1977 2